Capital punishment in Tajikistan is allowed by Article 18 of the 1999 Constitution of Tajikistan, which provides: 
The last known execution took place in 2004. That same year, a moratorium was issued on capital punishment by president Emomali Rahmon.

Tajikistan is not signatory to the Second Optional Protocol to the International Covenant on Civil and Political Rights, which aims to abolish the death penalty.

References

Tajikistan
Penal system in Tajikistan
Death in Tajikistan
Human rights abuses in Tajikistan